, 1171? – 1252?, was a Japanese poet; she was probably the greatest female poet of her day, ranked with Princess Shikishi. Although she was called Shunzei's Daughter, Shunzei was in fact her grandfather, and her birth father's name was Fujiwara no Moriyori. Her grandfather was the noted poet Fujiwara no Shunzei, and her half-uncle was Fujiwara no Teika, who thought enough of her talents to seek her out for advice and criticism after Shunzei died, although she did not hesitate to castigate him when he completed the Shinchokusen Wakashū, for Teika had turned against his former ideal poetic style of yoen (ethereal beauty) while Shunzei's Daughter had not- thus she found Teika's previous efforts to be markedly inferior, and even according to Donald Keene, "declared that if it had not been compiled by Teika she would have refused even to take it into her hands." (in a letter sent to Fujiwara no Tameie, Teika's son). She and others also criticized it for apparently deliberately excluding any of the objectively excellent poems produced by the three Retired Emperors exiled in the aftermath of the Jōkyū War. Personal pique may also have played a role, since she saw 29 of her poems selected for the Shinkokinshū while only nine were chosen for the Shin Chokusenshū.

Quote
How can I blame the cherry blossoms
for rejecting this floating world
and drifting away as the wind calls them?

See also
 Mumyōzōshi, a text on literary criticism presumably written by Shunzei's daughter

References

1170s births
1252 deaths
Fujiwara clan
Japanese nobility
13th-century Japanese women writers
Japanese women poets
13th-century Japanese women
13th-century Japanese poets
13th-century Japanese people
12th-century Japanese women
12th-century Japanese poets
12th-century Japanese people
Unidentified people